The Ultimate Collection is the fourth, major compilation album by Christian pop rock band Newsboys, released on 7 April 2009, and is the first double-disc format greatest hits album for the group.

The album is a part of The Ultimate Collection series, each of which spotlights 24 songs from various Christian recording artists.

The Newsboys' installment of The Ultimate Collection contains most of the songs that appeared on their 2007 compilation album, The Greatest Hits (minus "Real Good Thing" and "Reality," which are both absent on the double-disc set). In addition to the 16 songs that appeared on The Greatest Hits are "Woohoo," "Step Up to the Microphone," "Love Liberty Disco," "Beautiful Sound," "Who?," "In Christ Alone," "Devotion," and "Blessed Be Your Name."  The Ultimate Collection is the only Newsboys compilation to date to include their hit song "Love Liberty Disco."

Track listing
Disc 1

Disc 2

References

2006 greatest hits albums
Newsboys compilation albums
Sparrow Records compilation albums